The  is a toll road in Sendai, Miyagi Prefecture, Japan. It is owned and operated by the East Nippon Expressway Company (NEXCO East Japan). Along with the Sanriku Expressway, Sendai-Hokubu Road, Sendai-Tōbu Road, and Tōhoku Expressway it forms a ring road around the city, Sendai, known as the "Gurutto Sendai". The route is signed E48 under Ministry of Land, Infrastructure, Transport and Tourism's  "2016 Proposal for Realization of Expressway Numbering."

History
The Sendai-Nanbu Road was originally built in phases between 1981 and 2001 by the Miyagi Prefecture Road Corporation.

On 1 July 2013, the Miyagi Prefecture Road Corporation transferred ownership and the tolling of the road to NEXCO East Japan.

Junction list
The entire expressway is in Miyagi Prefecture.

See also

Japan National Route 6

References

External links

 East Nippon Expressway Company

Roads in Miyagi Prefecture
Toll roads in Japan
1981 establishments in Japan